"Mercy Me" is a song by the Chicago-based rock band Alkaline Trio, released as the second single from their 2005 album Crimson. "Mercy Me" was released to radio on September 27, 2005. It peaked at No. 30 on the UK Singles Chart and No. 89 on the Eurochart Hot 100 Singles. The single was released as a CD backed with an acoustic recording of "Private Eye" as well as "Buried", a B-side from the album's recording sessions. It was also released as a set of two 7" records, backed with acoustic recordings of "This Could Be Love" and "Crawl".

it us also featured as the title teack for the 2006 videogame Flatout 2.

The song's music video was directed by Ben Goldman.

Track listing

CD version 

The data portion of the enhanced CD consists of the music video for "Mercy Me".

7" version 1

7" version 2

Personnel

Band
Matt Skiba – guitar, lead vocals
Dan Andriano – bass, backing vocals
Derek Grant – drums

Production
Jerry Finn – producer, mix engineer
Ryan Hewitt – engineer
Seth Waldmann – assistant engineer
Dave Collins – mastering

References 

Alkaline Trio songs
2005 songs
Songs written by Matt Skiba
Songs written by Dan Andriano
Songs written by Derek Grant (drummer)
Vagrant Records singles
2005 singles